Coreopsideae is a tribe of flowering plants belonging to the Asteroideae subfamily. It includes widely cultivated genera such as Cosmos and Dahlia.

A similar group has been recognized since 1829, generally as part of the tribe Heliantheae (Cassini, 1819). In the late 20th century, molecular studies caused a slightly redefined version of this group to be recognized as its own tribe, Coreopsideae. The larger version of Heliantheae was split into tribes including Bahieae, Chaenactideae, Coreopsideae, Helenieae and, finally, Heliantheae (sensu stricto). Within the tribe, the traditional definition of genera based on flower and fruit characters does not reflect evolutionary relationships as inferred through molecular phylogenetics.

The tribe is characterized by shiny green bracts at the base of the flower head in two rows: an inner row of tightly spaced bracts and an outer row of a smaller number pointing downward. It includes five genera that use  carbon fixation: Chrysanthellum, Eryngiophyllum, Glossocardia (including Guerreroia), Isostigma, and Neuractis. These genera are thought to share a common ancestor and thus a single origin of  carbon fixation.

Genera 
Coreopsideae genera recognized by the Global Compositae Database as of April 2022:

Bidens 
Chrysanthellum 
Coreopsis 
Cosmos 
Cyathomone 
Dahlia 
Dicranocarpus 
Diodontium 
Ericentrodea 
Fitchia 
Glossocardia 
Goldmanella 
Henricksonia 
Heterosperma 
Hidalgoa 
Isostigma 
Koehneola 
Moonia 
Narvalina 
Oparanthus 
Petrobium 
Pinillosia 
Selleophytum 
Tetraperone 
Thelesperma 
Trioncinia

References

External links 

 
Asteraceae tribes